This is a list of Romania's representatives at major international beauty pageants:
Big Five international beauty pageants: Miss Universe, Miss World, Miss International, Miss Earth and the pageant for married ladies Mrs. World.

Big Four pageants
Romania has been represented in the Big Four international beauty pageants, the four major international beauty pageants for women. These are Miss World, Miss Universe, Miss International and Miss Earth.

Color key

Representatives at Miss Universe

Representatives at Miss World

Representatives at Miss International

Representatives at Miss Earth

Representatives at Miss Supranational

Representatives at Miss Grand International

Representatives at Miss Intercontinental

See also 

 Miss Universe Romania

References

External links
 

Beauty pageants in Romania
1920s establishments in Romania
1991 establishments in Romania
1990 establishments in Romania
Romanian awards
Romania
Romania
Romania
Romania
Romania
Romania